Leyte is an island in the Visayas group in the Philippines.

Leyte may also refer to:

Places in the Philippines 
Leyte (province), also known as Northern Leyte, a province of the Philippines that occupies the northern three-quarters of the island of Leyte
Leyte, Leyte, a municipality in Leyte province
Southern Leyte, a province in the Philippines that occupies the southern part of the island of Leyte
Leyte Gulf, the body of water immediately east of the island of Leyte

Military 
Battle of Leyte, the 1944 reconquest of the island by American troops and Filipino guerrillas
, a 1944 corvette of the Philippine Navy
, several US Navy ships

Other 
Carmen Leyte (born 1953), Spanish politician
Leyte F.A., East Visayas Regional Football Association, Philippines

See also
 Leyte frog (disambiguation)